Herbert W. Franke (14 May 1927 – 16 July 2022) was an Austrian scientist and writer. Die Zeit calls him "the most prominent German writing Science Fiction author".
He is also one of the important early computer artists (and collectors), creating computer graphics and early digital art since the late 1950s. Franke was also active in the fields of future research as well as speleology. He used his pen name Sergius Both as this Avatar name in Active Worlds and Opensimulator grids. The Sergius Both Award is given for creative scripting in Immersionskunst by Stiftung Kunstinformatik, first time issued at Amerika Art 2022.

Biography 
Franke was born in Vienna on 14 May 1927. Franke studied physics, mathematics, chemistry, psychology and philosophy in Vienna. He received his doctorate in theoretical physics in 1950 by writing a dissertation about electron optics. 

Since 1957, he worked as a freelance author. From 1973 to 1997 he held a lectureship in "Cybernetical Aesthetic" at Munich University (later computer graphics – computer art). In 1979, he co-founded Ars Electronica in Linz/Austria. In 1979 and 1980, he lectured in "introduction to perception psychology" at the Art & Design division of the Bielefeld University of Applied Sciences. Also in 1980 he became a selected member of the German PEN club.

A collection of short stories titled "The Green Comet" was his first publication. In 1998, Franke attended a SIGGRAPH computer graphics conference in Orlando and was a juror at the "VideoMath Festival" Berlin. He also took part in innumerable performances and presentations.

The archvie Herbert W. Franke is at ZKM | Center for Art and Media Karlsruhe.

Franke died in Egling on 16 July 2022 at the age of 95.

Publications 
 1963 "Planet der Verlorenen" (Planet of the lost) as Sergius Both.
 1964 The Magic of Molecules (Magie der Moleküle, 1958)
 1973 The Orchid Cage (Der Orchideenkäfig, 1961)
 1974 The Mind Net (Das Gedankennetz, 1961)
 1974 Zone Null (Zone Null, 1970)
 1979 Ypsilon minus (Ypsilon Minus, 1976)
 1971 Computer Graphics: Computer Art (Computergraphik – Computerkunst, 1971)
 2003 "Vorstoß in die Unterwelt – Abenteuer Höhlenforschung" (Approach to the Underworld – Adventure Cave Research) was published.
 2004 "Sphinx_2" released.
 2005 "Cyber City Süd" released.
 2006 "Auf der Spur des Engels" released.
 2007 "Flucht zum Mars" released.

Awards and honours 
1985 and 1991: Deutscher Science Fiction Preis (best novel)
1985, 1986, 2007: Kurd Lasswitz prize
1987 Computer art award of the German software manufacturer Association
1989 Phantastik-Preis der Stadt Wetzlar
1992 Karl Theodor Vogel Prize for technology journalism
2002 Dr. Benno-Wolf-Preis by VdHK (German Speleological Federation) – for merits in speleology
2007 Austrian Cross of Honour for Science and Art, 1st class
2007 Collection of projects in honor of Herbert W. Franke's 80's birthday on May 14th
2016 Life Time Award of the European Science Fiction Society "European Grand Master of Science Fiction"

Museum collections and exhibitions 
Abteiberg Museum
 ZKM Center for Art and Media Karlsruhe
 Kunsthalle Bremen
 Victoria and Albert Museum

References

External links

 Franke at the AVA International agency
 Franke's home page at the University of Munich 

1927 births
2022 deaths
Writers from Vienna
Austrian artists
Digital artists
Austrian digital artists
Austrian male writers
Computer graphics researchers
Austrian scientists
Austrian science fiction writers
Scientists from Vienna
Academic staff of the Ludwig Maximilian University of Munich
Recipients of the Austrian Cross of Honour for Science and Art, 1st class
Deutscher Fantasy Preis winners